Mohammed Nizamuddin (died 2016)  was an Indian trade unionist and politician, belonging to the Communist Party of India (Marxist). Mohammed Nizamuddin won the Entally constituency seat of the West Bengal Legislative Assembly in the 1971, 1977, 1982 and 1991 elections. He served as general secretary of the All India Beedi Workers Federation and was a member of the All India Working Committee of the Centre of Indian Trade Unions. He died in Kolkata on 21 June 2016, at the age of 83.

References

2016 deaths
Communist Party of India (Marxist) politicians from West Bengal
West Bengal MLAs 1971–1972
West Bengal MLAs 1977–1982
West Bengal MLAs 1982–1987
West Bengal MLAs 1991–1996
Trade unionists from West Bengal
Year of birth missing
1930s births